Little Missouri State Park is a public recreation area of over  located on the western side of the Little Missouri River, near the river's confluence with Lake Sakakawea,  north of Killdeer, North Dakota. Much of the state park consists of badlands terrain that is only accessible by trail. The majority of the park's area is managed under lease from federal and private owners.

Visitors' experiences of the park have been impacted by major oil drilling operations in the Killdeer area that began in 2011 and that include land within the park. In 2015, the oil company ConocoPhillips agreed to move trails at its own expense to skirt hikers and riders around well sites. In 2016, Governor Jack Dalrymple asked that drillers make a concerted effort "to preserve the view-scape as much as possible."

References

External links
Little Missouri State Park North Dakota Parks and Recreation 
Little Missouri State Park Map North Dakota Parks and Recreation

State parks of North Dakota
Protected areas of Dunn County, North Dakota
Protected areas established in 1971
1971 establishments in North Dakota
State Park